This is a list of the main career statistics of professional tennis player Nicolas Mahut.

Performance timelines

Singles

Doubles
Current through the 2023 Mexican Open.

1 Including appearances in Grand Slam, ATP Tour main draw matches, and Summer Olympics.
2 Including matches in Grand Slam, ATP Tour events, Summer Olympics, Davis Cup, World Team Cup and ATP Cup.
* not held due to COVID-19 pandemic.

Significant finals

Grand Slam finals

Doubles: 8 (5 titles, 3 runner-up)

Year-end championships

Doubles: 3 (2 titles, 1 runner-up)

Masters 1000 finals

Doubles: 11 (7 titles, 4 runner-ups)

ATP World Tour career finals

Singles: 6 (4 titles, 2 runner-ups)

Doubles: 57 (37 titles, 20 runner-ups)

Other finals

ATP Challenger Tour and ITF Men's Circuit

Singles: 27 (17 titles, 10 runner-ups)

Doubles: 35 (26 titles, 9 runner-ups)

ITF Junior's Circuit

Singles: 4 (1 title, 3 runner-ups)

Doubles: 11 (8 titles, 3 runner-up)

Top 10 wins
Mahut has a  record against players who were, at the time the match was played, ranked in the top 10.

Career Grand Slam seedings  
The tournaments won by Mahut are in boldface, while those where he was runner-up are in italics.

Singles

Doubles 

*

See also 
Longest tennis match records
Isner–Mahut match at the 2010 Wimbledon Championships
France Davis Cup team
List of France Davis Cup team representatives
Sport in France

References

External links
 
 Nicolas Mahut at the ITF profile
 

Mahut, Nicolas